The Seed is a 1940 novel by the Norwegian writer Tarjei Vesaas. The narrative is set on a small island where a stranger settles. This is soon followed by a mysterious murder case, which creates widespread distrust in the community. The novel was the author's first departure from literary realism into a more allegorical mode of storytelling. An English translation by Kenneth G. Chapman was published in 1964, in a shared volume with Vesaas' novel Spring Night.

The Seed was the basis for a 1974 film with the same title, directed by Erik Solbakken.

References

External links
 Publicity page at the Norwegian publisher's website 

20th-century Norwegian novels
Norwegian-language novels
Norwegian novels adapted into films
Novels by Tarjei Vesaas